Bob Evers is a Dutch novel series of boys' books, named for the main character, written by Dutch author Willem van den Hout, under the pseudonym Willy van der Heide. The series was started in 1949; 32 volumes were published until 1963. Van den Hout published two additional volumes in 1977, and the series was extended by Peter de Zwaan, who published volume 50 in 2010. An estimated five million Bob Evers books were sold.

History

The origin of the Bob Evers series was a feuilleton in a 1943 issue of the Nazi magazine Jeugd ("Youth"), "De avonturen van 3 jongens in de Stille Zuidzee" ("The adventures of three boys in the Pacific")—at the time, van den Hout published for a number of magazines associated with Fascist parties, including the NSB. After the war, when his credentials as a journalist were revoked, he revived the idea, renaming his protagonist Bob Evers (he had been called Rob Evers in 1943).

Van den Hout was under contract with M. Stenvert and Son, a publishing company from Meppel. He wrote 32 books for the series (volume 33 was never finished). He sold the rights to Stenvert in 1967 for 100,000 guilders, and later tried to get them back, unsuccessfully. He wrote two more volumes in breach of contract, after which the series was continued by Peter de Zwaan.

Characters
Arie Roos - A chubby redhead, profligate with money and with a gift for gab; he is able to talk himself out of any trouble. Like Jan Prins, he is a student at the Hogere Burgerschool. Son of Shipping magnate Roos (of 'Rederij Roos') 
Jan Prins - Skinny and frugal, he plays the straight man to Arie Roos. Son of Colonel Prins late of the Dutch army in the Dutch East-Indies
Bob Evers - Formerly Rob Evers, the son of a machine engineering magnate from Pittsburg, he became Bob Evers, an American boy and friend of Arie and Jan.

Adaptations

The novels were also adapted into a series of comic books, with Frans Jonker as scriptwriter and Hans van Oudenaarden as artist.

References

External links

Encyclopaedia Apriana, comprehensive Bob Evers website with names, cars, weapons, locations, etc.

Dutch children's novels
Evers, Bob
Evers, Bob
Novels adapted into comics
Series of children's books
Evers, Bob
Novels set in the Netherlands